Ogihara (written: 荻原 lit. "Miscanthus sacchariflorus field") is a Japanese surname. Notable people with the surname include:

, Japanese voice actor
, Japanese musician

Ōgihara, Oogihara, Ougihara or Ohgihara (written: 扇原) is a separate Japanese surname, though both may be transliterated the same way. Notable people with the surname include:
, Japanese footballer

Japanese-language surnames